Lualdi is a surname. Notable people with the surname include:

Adriano Lualdi (1885–1971), Italian composer and conductor
Alessandro Lualdi (1858-1927), Italian Roman Catholic cardinal
Antonella Lualdi (born 1931), Italian actress and singer
Valerio Lualdi (born 1951), Italian racing cyclist